Babingtonia maleyae, commonly known as the Narrogin babingtonia, is a shrub endemic to Western Australia.

It is found in a small area in the Wheatbelt region of Western Australia near Narrogin.

References

Eudicots of Western Australia
maleyae
Endemic flora of Western Australia
Plants described in 2015
Taxa named by Barbara Lynette Rye
Taxa named by Malcolm Eric Trudgen